Shanti Devi (born 1937) is an Indian former politician from the state of Uttar Pradesh. She has twice represented Sambhal in the Lok Sabha and has been a member of both houses of the Uttar Pradesh legislature.

Early life
Shanti Devi is the daughter of Chaudhary Badan Singh Yadav and was born on 30 January 1937 at Jarif Nagar of Badaun district. She was educated till matriculation level.

Career
From 1962 to 1968, Devi was a member of the Uttar Pradesh Legislative Council. She was elected to the Uttar Pradesh Legislative Assembly in 1974. Three years later, she stood for and won the 1977 Indian general election from Sambhal as a member of the Bharatiya Lok Dal, obtaining 64.29% of the total votes polled. In the next general election she joined the Janata Party (Secular) but lost to Bijendra Pal Singh of Indian National Congress (Indira) (INC (I)).

For the 1984 Indian general election Devi switched to INC (I) and won the seat, receiving 36.46% votes. After finishing her term of five years she stood for re-election from Sambhal but lost to S.P. Yadav of Janata Dal. She secured 39.28% votes and finished in the second place.

Personal life
Devi has four sons from her marriage to Chaudhary Jagannath Singh Yadav.

References

1937 births
Living people
India MPs 1977–1979
India MPs 1984–1989
Women members of the Lok Sabha
Lok Sabha members from Uttar Pradesh
People from Budaun district
Indian National Congress politicians from Uttar Pradesh
Uttar Pradesh MLAs 1974–1977
Members of the Uttar Pradesh Legislative Council
Bharatiya Lok Dal politicians
Janata Dal (Secular) politicians
Women members of the Karnataka Legislative Assembly